The Arcata mine is a large silver mine located in the south of Peru in Arequipa Region. Arcata represents one of the largest silver reserve in Peru and in the world having estimated reserves of 46.6 million oz of silver.

Statistics

See also  
List of mines in Peru
Silver mining

References 

Silver mines in Peru